The Wezenberg Olympic Swimming Center is a swimming center with a 50-meter pool located on De Singel in Antwerp. The complex dates from 1973. In addition to the Olympic-size swimming pool, there is an instruction pool of 20 by 17 meters in Wezenberg and since 2015 a second 50-meter pool, not wide enough for competitions, but for training.

History 
In 1920 there was already an Olympic outdoor swimming pool on the Wezenberg. It was the location for Swimming at the 1920 Summer Olympics. In 1951, a new outdoor swimming pool was opened and used for years before work on the indoor swimming pool started in the 1970s. The new swimming pool was opened in 1973.

From September 2014 to September 2015, a second Olympic pool was built at 8 m from the existing pool, Wezenberg 2, with six swimming lanes that will not be open to the public, but will be used as a training pool for top athletes. This pool will be expanded with a equipment for image and time registration. Wezenberg 2 is 50.025 m long, 16 meters wide and 2.2 m deep. The construction of Wezenberg 2 cost 8 million euros, of which 4.5 million by the City of Antwerp and 3.5 million by the Flemish government. The trainings in the new bath were possible from October 1, 2015, the opening took place on November 27, 2015.

The swimming center is the home base of Swimming club Brabo with Pieter Timmers and Kimberly Buys, among others. In Wezenberg, the provincial championships are also organized every year, as well as the international club competition Antwerp International Youth Swimming Cup. The Belgian championships are held regularly in the swimming pool, such as the BK 2010. In the summer of 2012, the European Junior Championships took place for the fourth time, previously this also happened in 1991, 1998 and 2007. In 2001, the European Championships short swimming championships organized.

The total area is 7,500 m². The stands have 800 seats. Renovations took place in 2001–2002, 2011 and 2015, among which work by Benoît van Innis was applied to wall tiles.

References

 Original Wikipedia Dutch language article

Swimming venues in Belgium
Buildings and structures in Antwerp
Sport in Antwerp